The National Independence Day Parade is an annual parade held on Independence Day in Washington, D.C. It traditionally takes place on Constitution Avenue, and is sponsored and co-produced by Music Celebrations International and the National Park Service,

It features various military performers, contingents and invited guests, including the 257th Army Band, the Old Guard Fife and Drum Corps, the joint-service honor guard battalion of the Joint Force Headquarters National Capital Region, officers of the Metropolitan Police Department of the District of Columbia, and representatives of the foreign expatriate communities. It also includes nominated representatives of the high schools and colleges and cultural groups inside the DCPS and from each of the 50 states, Puerto Rico, and overseas territories.

The parade was canceled in 2020 and 2021 due to COVID-19.

External links

Sources

Military parades in the United States
Parades in the United States
Annual events in the United States
Events in Washington, D.C.
Independence Day (United States) festivals
July events
Annual events
Articles containing video clips